Swiss Holiday Park is a holiday and leisure resort in Morschach, Switzerland, one of the largest such resorts in the country. The park has around 600,000 visitors (day visitors and holidaymakers) every year.

History 
The park is originated in the Belle Epoque. Before the turn of the century until the stock market crash in 1929, Morschach was a popular retreat for noblemen, industrialists, merchants and kings (e.g. Queen Victoria or King Ludwig II of Bavaria). Tourism around Lake Lucerne was then severely affected by the world economic crisis and World War II.

In 1982, the first larger hotel Axenfels was opened with the aim of continuing the tradition of the past epoch. Furthermore, the leisure park, further sleeping facilities and the park's congress centre were realised and completed in 1996.

In 2002, the Schwyzer Kantonalbank took over the operating company of the park (Swiss Holiday Park AG). Since then the park has been growing continuously. The park is considered one of the largest employers in the region and the district of Schwyz. Today, the Holiday Park positions itself as a generation-spanning leisure, sports, wellness and business resort.

Accommodation 
The park has 900 beds in apartments, shared rooms, a 3-star guesthouse and a 4-star hotel.

Offer (selection) 
The park offers the following indoor and outdoor recreational opportunities for day- and holiday guests:

 Sports and games facilities (outdoor go-cart track, mini-golf course, Flyingfox, indoor climbing wall, bowling alley, fitness centre with group courses, squash, tennis, badminton court, etc.)
 Adventure farm called Fronalp (farm with riding lessons, stable visit, milk room with milk vending machine, etc.)
 Adventure pool & wellness offer (incl. sauna landscape, spa, a bathing landscape, adventure slides, etc.)
 Food offer with different pubs and restaurants

Operator 
The Swiss Holiday Park is operated by Swiss Holiday Park AG. The delegate of the board of directors is Walter Trösch.

Trivia 
The Swiss author Blanca Imboden wrote her novel and bestseller called Wandern ist doof. Ein Kreuzworträtsel mit Folgen at the Swiss Holiday Park. The plot of the book was also set in a recreation resort.

References

External links 
 

Resorts in Switzerland